Gregorio Barradas Miravete (8 February 1982 – 8 November 2010) was a Mexican politician for the National Action Party.

He was born in Juan Rodríguez Clara, Veracruz, in 1982. On 8 November 2010, Miravete was kidnapped and killed in Isla, Veracruz.

See also
Mexican Drug War
List of kidnappings
List of politicians killed in the Mexican Drug War
List of unsolved murders

References

External links
 Official politician page 

1982 births
2010 deaths
21st-century Mexican politicians
Assassinated Mexican politicians
Kidnapped Mexican people
Kidnapped politicians
Male murder victims
Members of the Chamber of Deputies (Mexico)
Mexican murder victims
National Action Party (Mexico) politicians
Politicians from Veracruz
People murdered in Mexico
Unsolved murders in Mexico
Politicians killed in the Mexican Drug War